HSS Discovery was a high-speed ferry owned by Albamar Shipping Company. It is a member of the HSS 1500 class of high-speed ferries built for and designed by Stena Line from 1996 onwards. The vessel was previously named Stena Discovery and operated for Stena Line between Harwich International Port in the United Kingdom and Hook of Holland, the Netherlands.

Design and construction
The HSS Discovery was constructed by Finnyards in Rauma, Finland. Construction commenced in 1996 and the vessel entered service in April 1997.

The vessel was a catamaran and was designed with the aim of providing a comfortable and fast service.

Power was provided by four GE Aviation gas turbines in a twin combined gas and gas (COGAG) configuration. The vessel employed four Kamewa waterjets for propulsion.

The HSS class of ferries were designed to allow quick turnarounds at port. A specially designed linkspan provides ropeless mooring and allows quick loading, unloading and servicing. Vehicles were loaded via two of the four stern doors and parked in a "U" configuration. When disembarking, vehicles drove straight off via the other three doors.

Career
As the Stena Discovery, the vessel operated between Harwich and Hook of Holland for Stena Line from its introduction in 1997 until January 2007 when it was taken out of service due to its high fuel consumption. The vessel was laid up at Belfast between January 2007 and September 2009, before departing for La Guaira, Venezuela under the ownership of Albamar Shipping Company. Prior to its departure from Belfast, the "Stena" prefix was removed from the vessel's name.

It served only briefly in Venezuela and was taken out of service again in 2009. In November 2011, it was moved to the Caribbean island of Curaçao in an attempt to attract investors for a new ferry service from Curaçao to La Guaira. It was subject to a criminal investigation shortly afterwards regarding irregulatory trade of diesel from the ballast tanks. She was scrapped in Aliağa, Turkey between August and November 2015.

Incidents
In January 1998, Stena Discovery was travelling at full speed when it hit a 3.5m swell, resulting in water being pushed up over the nose and hitting the bridge windows. The swell ripped through the underside of the nose. It was later discovered that this was beyond Stena Discovery'''s design capability. Small air holes were fitted on the underside of the nose to prevent a repeat incident.
 In March 2001, the driver of an 18 tonne lorry (loaded with 12 tonnes of fresh fish) failed to put his vehicle's handbrake on during a crossing of the Stena Discovery'' from Hook of Holland to Harwich. As the ferry accelerated, the lorry rolled back, crashed through the vessel's stern doors, and plunged into the North Sea. It took along with it three smaller vans as well as one of the stern doors. The vessel returned to Hook of Holland and was taken out of service for repairs. Damage to the door and loss of the vehicles was estimated to be in the region of £200,000.

References

Ships built in Rauma, Finland
1996 ships
High-speed craft
Discovery